Orobanche ramosa is a species of broomrape known by the common names hemp broomrape and branched broomrape. It is native to Eurasia and North Africa, but it is known in many other places as an introduced species and sometimes a noxious weed.

It is a pest in agricultural fields, infesting crops including tobacco, potato, and tomato.

The plant produces many slender, erect stems from a thick root. The yellowish stems grow 10 to 60 centimeters tall and are coated in glandular hairs. The broomrape is parasitic on other plants, draining nutrients from their roots, and it lacks leaves and chlorophyll. The inflorescence bears several flowers, each in a yellowish calyx of sepals and with a tubular white and blue to purple corolla.

References

Further reading

External links
Jepson Manual Treatment
Photo gallery

ramosa
Plants described in 1753
Taxa named by Carl Linnaeus